Lynbert R. Johnson (born September 7, 1957) is a retired American professional basketball player. He was selected in the 1979 NBA Draft by the Golden State Warriors, playing nine games for them in the 1979-80 season, averaging 3.0 points and 1.6 rebounds per game. During his tenure at Wichita State University his nickname was 'Cheese' which was a name given to him by some of the older guys who watched him play at Rucker Park. Also, he would smile extremely wide when someone would fall while on the basketball court. Johnson was inducted into the Wichita State Shocker Sports Hall of Fame in 1986.

Biography
Born in New York, New York, Johnson attended Haaren High School in Midtown Manhattan. He was rated as one of the Top 15 High School players in the nation his senior year. He was a New York City playground legend and was virtually unstoppable from fifteen feet and in. While at Wichita State, Cheese was one of the top players in the Missouri Valley Conference.
At 6'5 Cheese could play all positions on the court. At Wichita it was common for Cheese to score twenty points and collect ten rebounds per game.
Cheese Johnson was the Missouri Valley Conference "Newcomer of the Year" in 1976 and was a first-team all-MVC selection in 1977 and 1979 and was a second-team pick in 1978. 
He led WSU in scoring for three years and in rebounding twice. Johnson ranked third at the time of his induction into the Hall in total career rebounds at WSU with 1,027. 
He also ranked fifth in total points scored with 1,907 and fifth in field goal percentage having made over 52 percent of his shots during his college career. His 17.3 career scoring average at WSU ranked him seventh all-time at the school at the time of his induction and his 9.3 per game rebound average was the school¹s tenth-best all-time total.

During his senior year, the 1978-79 season, Cheese averaged 22.2 points per game.

In addition to his brief time with the Warriors, Johnson played two seasons in the Continental Basketball Association for the Utica Olympics (1979–80) and the Rochester Zeniths (1980–81).

Notes

External links
NBA stats @ basketballreference.com
Lynbert "Cheese" Johnson (Basketball, 1976-79)

1957 births
Living people
American men's basketball players
Basketball players from New York City
Golden State Warriors draft picks
Golden State Warriors players
Haaren High School alumni
Parade High School All-Americans (boys' basketball)
Small forwards
Utica Olympics players
Wichita State Shockers men's basketball players